The Federation of Zoroastrian Associations of North America (FEZANA) is a non-profit religious group registered in the state of Illinois and formed to function as the coordinating organization for Zoroastrian Associations of North America.
FEZANA publishes a three-monthly magazine, FEZANA Journal which deals with such subjects as religion and youth, Zoroastrianism in North America, etc.
FEZANA organizes a (Zoroastrian) Excellence in Sports Scholarship (EXISS) each year, in a city in North America, in which every sportive Zoroastrian between the age of 10 and the age of 30 can participate.

Related pages
Zoroastrian Trust Funds of Europe

External links
FEZANA

Zoroastrian organizations